Morris Goes to School is a short stop-motion animated children's film released in 1989. It is based on the children's picture book of the same name written and illustrated by B. Wiseman, and was produced by Churchill Films. In 1993, the company created another short film based on Morris the Moose called Morris Has a Cold.

Plot 
 Morris the moose is happily strolling through the countryside, when he finds a penny, and stashes it with his others. He decides to head into town and buy something.

He mistakenly enters a fish store ("It's Mel's Fish"), and asks the cashier for candy. The cashier explains that it is a fish store, and discovers that Morris can't read, and points him to the candy store.

At the candy store, the candyman discovers that Morris can only count to four. After helping him with getting candy, he takes Morris to the local school (Wiseman Elementary School).

The candyman introduces Morris to the teacher, Mrs. Fine, and Morris takes a seat with the rest of the students. While learning the alphabet, the letter B reminds Morris of a stinging bee. The letter C then reminds Morris of how much he loves the sea. Mrs. Fine tells him that he needs to raise his hand when he wishes to speak. Morris then has to go to the bathroom, but accidentally goes into the girls' bathroom, since he can't read.

Later on, while spelling words, Morris is upset that they didn't spell "moose". The class then spells moose. It is then time for lunch, and recess. Morris plays with the other students. Next it's time for art, and they are fingerpainting. During art, Mrs. Fine explains the grammar of the phrase "this is fun".

Next it's time to count. Mrs. Fine shows Morris that he can count all the way to 12 using his antlers. Then it's music time and they all sing a song called "Feed Your Brain". After that, they play "make-believe".

When school is over, Morris decides to celebrate his first day by buying gumdrops from the candy store, this time doing all the reading and counting himself.

Voice cast 
The following information is directly from the credits of the film.

 Will Ryan as Morris, the Fish store clerk, the Candy store clerk
 Diane Michelle as Mrs. Fine   
 Cindy Hahn, Jimmy Guardino, Renee Roman, Kari Doyle, Ryan Polisky, Nigel Matthews, and Nathan Matthews as the children.

Crew 
Most of the following information is directly from the credits of the film.

 John Clark Matthews - Writer, Director, Producer, Songwriter, Production Designer, Character Sculpture
 George McQuilkin - Executive Producer
 Steve Kohn – Music Composition
 Will Ryan – Songwriter
 Escott O. Norton – Production Designer, Model & Set Construction, Lighting Setups
 Justin Kohn - Animation, Armature
 Joel Fletcher – Animation, Character Sculpture
 Gail Vandermerwe - Animation
 Jeremy Bishop - Model & Set Construction
 George Wong - Model & Set Construction
 Doug Beswick – Armature
 Peter Marinello – Armature
 Anthony Scott – Graphic Animation
 Niki Matthews – Puppet Construction
 Steve Koch – Character Sculpture

Awards 
C.I.N.E. Golden Eagle

First Prize - Chicago International Festival of Children's Films

Gold Award - Parent's Choice

Gold Medal - International Film & TV Festival of New York

Booklist Non-Print Editor's Choice

Four Stars - ABC - CLIO Video Rating Guide for Libraries

Second Prize - Los Angeles International Animation Celebration

U.S. News & World Report Critic's Choice

Birmingham International Educational Film Festival - ACE Nominee - Best Children's Show

References 

1989 short films
Animated films based on children's books